John Hopper may refer to:
 John Hopper (politician) (John D. Hopper), member of the Pennsylvania State Senate
 John Hopper (scientist), Australian genetic epidemiologist and professor
 John D. Hopper Jr., United States Air Force general

See also
 John Hopper House, in Hackensack, Bergen County, New Jersey, United States